Group B of the 2008 Fed Cup Americas Zone Group I was one of two pools in the Americas Zone Group I of the 2008 Fed Cup. Four teams competed in a round robin competition, with the top team and the bottom two teams proceeding to their respective sections of the play-offs: the top teams played for advancement to the World Group II Play-offs, while the bottom teams faced potential relegation to Group II.

Colombia vs. Mexico

Canada vs. Mexico

Canada vs. Colombia

See also
Fed Cup structure

References

External links
 Fed Cup website

2008 Fed Cup Americas Zone